The 1932 Manitoba general election was held on June 16, 1932 to elect Members of the Legislative Assembly of the Province of Manitoba, Canada. A Liberal-Progressive majority government was elected.

This was the second election in Manitoba where two types of preferential voting was used in all electoral divisions.  Winnipeg elected ten members through single transferable ballot, while all other constituencies elected one member by instant runoff voting.

The election was called soon after the announcement of an alliance between the governing Progressive Party of John Bracken and the Liberal Party led by Murdoch Mackay.  These parties were ideologically similar, and had a common interest in preventing the Conservative Party from coming to power.  National Liberal leader William Lyon Mackenzie King supported this alliance, out of concern that a Conservative victory would strengthen the hand of Conservative Prime Minister Richard Bennett.

Bracken tried to bring the Conservatives into his coalition, but was rebuffed by Conservative leader Fawcett Taylor.  Taylor's refusal to consider a consensus government was used against him in the campaign.

The election was also contested by the social democratic Independent Labour Party, under the leadership of John Queen.  Though it was the second-largest party in the legislature after the 1920 election, Labour had slumped to only three seats in 1927 amid a general period of decline in the Canadian left.  While the ILP was poised to improve its showing in the 1932 campaign, it was not a serious contender for government. In the event it elected only five MLAs, four in Winnipeg and one in St. Boniface, evidence of the benefits of preferential balloting to a minority party.

Some members of the provincial Liberal Party opposed the Liberal-Progressive alliance, and contested the election as "continuing Liberals".  Their leader was David Campbell, the mayor of St. Boniface.

Leslie Morris and Jacob Penner of the Communist Party campaigned in the city of Winnipeg, and other Communist candidates ran in the outlying areas.  As the Communist Party was under legal restrictions at the time, they ran as "United Front Workers" candidates.  Former Member of the Legislative Assembly (MLA) George Armstrong ran as a candidate of the Socialist Party, and Jessie MacLennan campaigned as a labour candidate unaffiliated with the ILP.

The result was a resounding victory for the governing alliance, as Liberals, Progressives and their allies won 38 out of 55 seats. The Conservatives fell from fifteen seats to ten.  Having lost his third consecutive election, Fawcett Taylor resigned as Conservative leader in 1933.  The Independent Labour Party managed a modest recovery after its poor showing in 1927, increasing its caucus to five members.  No other parties' candidates were elected, although two former Progressives were elected as independents.  The Continuing Liberals fared especially poorly, and disappeared after the election.

Leslie Morris came 309 votes short of winning the tenth seat in Winnipeg.  Had he won, he would have been the first Communist elected to a provincial legislature in Canada.

The new Legislature would see 15 new MLAs, ten arising from incumbents being defeated, and the other five from open seats. Of the latter, four incumbents chose not to run, and one incumbent (John H. Edmison of Brandon) had died in March 1932.

Results

First-preference votes by riding

Results by riding
Incumbents are marked with *.

For Liberal and Progressive incumbents:
() = Progressive MLA in previous Legislature
() = Liberal MLA in previous Legislature

Seats changing hands
In the single-member ridings, 13 seats changed allegiance:

 Conservative to Liberal-Progressive

 Cypress
 Dauphin
 Killarney
 Manitou
 Morden & Rhineland

 Conservative to ILP

 St. Boniface

 Conservative to Independent-LP

 Roblin

 Liberal-Progressive to Conservative

 Swan River

 Liberal-Progressive to Independent-Progressive

 Birtle

 Liberal-Progressive to Independent-Farmer-Labour

 Springfield

 Independent to Conservative
 Brandon

 Independent-Farmer to Liberal-Progressive

 Ethelbert

 Independent-Progressive to Independent-LP

 Iberville

(Italics indicate that incumbent changed allegiance)

In Winnipeg, the seat distribution was changed as follows:

Turnover on runoff
In the single-member ridings, there was only one case where the first-place candidate on first-preference votes failed to win:

|-
! rowspan="2" colspan="2"|Party
! rowspan="2"|Candidate
! colspan="2"|First-preference votes
! colspan="3"|Maximum votes
|- style="text-align:right; background-color:#E9E9E9; text-align:center"
! Votes
! % 
! Votes
! Round
! Initial vs transfer votes mix

| style="text-align:left;" |Joseph Bernier*
| 3,483
| 30.66
| 4,470
| 3
| style="text-align:left;" |

| style="text-align:left;" |Independent Labour
| style="text-align:left;" |Harold Lawrence
| 3,477
| 30.61
| 4,954
| 3
| style="text-align:left;" |

| style="text-align:left;" |L.P. Gagnon
| 3,283
| 28.90
| 3,560
| 2
| style="text-align:left;" |

| style="text-align:left;" |Continuing Liberal
| style="text-align:left;" |David Campbell
| 1,116
| 9.83
| 1,116
| 1
| style="text-align:left;" |
|-
| colspan="3" style="text-align:left;" |Total
|11,359
|100.00
|colspan="3"|  
|-
| colspan="5" style="text-align:left;" |Exhausted votes
|1,935
|17.03%
| style="text-align:left;" |
|}

In the second count, Lawrence received enough transfers from Campbell to lead by 82 votes. He would receive a significant share from Gagnon's transfers to finish with a lead of 484 votes. Lawrence would become the first-ever ILP MLA for the riding.

Multiple-LP  candidate contests

In two ridings, two LP candidatesrespectively nominated by the party's Liberal and Progressive wingswere on the ballot.

|-
! rowspan="2" colspan="2"|Party
! rowspan="2"|Candidate
! colspan="2"|First-preference votes
! colspan="3"|Maximum votes
|- style="text-align:right; background-color:#E9E9E9; text-align:center"
! Votes
! % 
! Votes
! Round
! Initial vs transfer votes mix

| style="text-align:left;" |Einar Jonasson
| 1,340
| 31.81
| 1,704
| 4
| style="text-align:left;" |

| style="text-align:left;" |Ingimar Ingaldson*
| 1,069
| 25.37
| 1,410
| 4
| style="text-align:left;" |

| style="text-align:left;" |Gunnar Thorvaldson
| 858
| 20.37
| 858
| 3
| style="text-align:left;" |

| style="text-align:left;" |United Front Workers
| style="text-align:left;" |Iwan Kapusta
| 710
| 16.85
| 716
| 2
| style="text-align:left;" |

| style="text-align:left;" |Continuing Liberal
| style="text-align:left;" |Michael Ewanchuk
| 236
| 5.60
| 236
| 1
| style="text-align:left;" |
|-
| colspan="3" style="text-align:left;" |Total
|4,213
|100.00
|colspan="3"|  
|-
| colspan="5" style="text-align:left;" |Exhausted votes
|1,099
|26.09%
| style="text-align:left;" |
|}

|-
! rowspan="2" colspan="2"|Party
! rowspan="2"|Candidate
! colspan="2"|First-preference votes
! colspan="3"|Maximum votes
|- style="text-align:right; background-color:#E9E9E9; text-align:center"
! Votes
! % 
! Votes
! Round
! Initial vs transfer votes mix

| style="text-align:left;" |Ewan McPherson
| 312
| 48.90
| 319
| 2
| style="text-align:left;" |

| style="text-align:left;" |Herbert G. Beresford*
| 215
| 33.70
| 229
| 2
| style="text-align:left;" |

| style="text-align:left;" |Capt. Evans Atkinson
| 111
| 17.40
| 111
| 1
| style="text-align:left;" |
|-
| colspan="3" style="text-align:left;" |Total
|638
|100.00
|colspan="3"|  
|-
| colspan="5" style="text-align:left;" |Exhausted votes
|90
|14.11%
| style="text-align:left;" |
|}

McPherson had previously failed to unseat Fawcett Taylor in Portage la Prairie on Election Day, so he opted to campaign again in Rupertsland, which had been deferred to July 14. This time he was successful.

Winnipeg
Winnipeg (ten members):

Valid votes: 76,991
Quota: 7000 votes

|-
! rowspan="2" colspan="2"|Party
! rowspan="2"|Candidate
! colspan="2"|First-preference votes
! colspan="3"|Maximum votes
|- style="text-align:right; background-color:#E9E9E9; text-align:center"
! Votes
! % 
! Votes
! Round
! Initial vs transfer votes mix

| style="text-align:left;" |William Sanford Evans*
| 13,507
| 17.54
| 13,507
| 1
| style="text-align:left;" |

| style="text-align:left;" |Independent Labour
| style="text-align:left;" |John Queen*
| 9,302
| 12.08
| 9,302
| 1
| style="text-align:left;" |

| style="text-align:left;" |William Major*
| 5,940
| 7.72
| 7,044
| 17
| style="text-align:left;" |

| style="text-align:left;" |Independent Labour
| style="text-align:left;" |Seymour Farmer*
| 5,053
| 6.56
| 7,105
| 11
| style="text-align:left;" |

| style="text-align:left;" |John Thomas Haig*
| 4,432
| 5.76
| 7,019
| 5
| style="text-align:left;" |

| style="text-align:left;" |John Stewart McDiarmid
| 3,540
| 4.60
| 6,060
| 24
| style="text-align:left;" |

| style="text-align:left;" |Huntly Ketchen
| 3,530
| 4.59
| 7,486
| 22
| style="text-align:left;" |

| style="text-align:left;" |United Front Workers
| style="text-align:left;" |Leslie Morris
| 3,455
| 4.49
| 4,959
| 24
| style="text-align:left;" |

| style="text-align:left;" |Independent Labour
| style="text-align:left;" |Marcus Hyman
| 3,366
| 4.37
| 6,593
| 24
| style="text-align:left;" |

| style="text-align:left;" |Ralph Maybank
| 2,945
| 3.83
| 5,268
| 24
| style="text-align:left;" |

| style="text-align:left;" |C. Andrusyshen
| 2,693
| 3.50
| 2,923
| 20
| style="text-align:left;" |

| style="text-align:left;" |Independent Labour
| style="text-align:left;" |William Ivens*
| 2,262
| 2.94
| 5,470
| 24
| style="text-align:left;" |

| style="text-align:left;" |William V. Tobias*
| 1,991
| 2.59
| 2,045
| 19
| style="text-align:left;" |

| style="text-align:left;" |R.W.B. Swail
| 1,951
| 2.53
| 3,547
| 21
| style="text-align:left;" |

| style="text-align:left;" |Edward William Montgomery*
| 1,614
| 2.10
| 2,177
| 18
| style="text-align:left;" |

| style="text-align:left;" |Jessie MacLennan
| 1,600
| 2.08
| 2,082
| 16
| style="text-align:left;" |

| style="text-align:left;" |James Alexander Barry
| 1,549
| 2.01
| 4,780
| 23
| style="text-align:left;" |

| style="text-align:left;" |F.W. Russell
| 1,339
| 1.74
| 1,570
| 15
| style="text-align:left;" |

| style="text-align:left;" |United Front Workers
| style="text-align:left;" |Jacob Penner
| 1,106
| 1.44
| 1,106
| 13
| style="text-align:left;" |

| style="text-align:left;" |Independent Labour
| style="text-align:left;" |V.B. Anderson
| 1,061
| 1.38
| 1,061
| 14
| style="text-align:left;" |

| style="text-align:left;" |Independent Labour
| style="text-align:left;" |Beatrice Brigden
| 894
| 1.16
| 1,084
| 10
| style="text-align:left;" |

| style="text-align:left;" |George Armstrong
| 848
| 1.10
| 880
| 9
| style="text-align:left;" |

|style="text-align:left;"|Continuing Liberal
| style="text-align:left;" |H.P.A. Hermanson
| 688
| 0.89
| 1,331
| 13
| style="text-align:left;" |

| style="text-align:left;" |Duncan Cameron
| 597
| 0.78
| 597
| 7
| style="text-align:left;" |

|style="text-align:left;"|Continuing Liberal
| style="text-align:left;" |John Y. Reid
| 588
| 0.76
| 812
| 8
| style="text-align:left;" |

|style="text-align:left;"|Continuing Liberal
| style="text-align:left;" |Clarence G. Keith
| 548
| 0.71
| 588
| 6
| style="text-align:left;" |

| style="text-align:left;" |D.M. Elcheshen
| 314
| 0.41
| 378
| 4
| style="text-align:left;" |

| style="text-align:left;" |W.J. Fulton
| 182
| 0.24
| 182
| 3
| style="text-align:left;" |

| style="text-align:left;" |Thomas Gargan
| 96
| 0.12
| 96
| 3
| style="text-align:left;" |
|-
| colspan="3" style="text-align:left;" |Total
|76,991
|100.00
|colspan="3"|  
|-
| colspan="5" style="text-align:left;" |Exhausted votes
|11,600
|15.07%
| style="text-align:left;" |
|}

Sources

The first ballot results for Winnipeg and results for all other constituencies are taken from an official Manitoba government publication entitled "Manitoba elections, 1920-1941", cross-referenced with an appendix to the government's report of the 2003 provincial election.  The Canadian parliamentary guide lists slightly different results from Kildonan & St. Andrews, Lansdowne, La Verendrye, Morris, Springfield and Turtle Mountain; the other two sources are more comprehensive, however, and may be taken as more reliable.

All ballot results for Winnipeg after the first count are taken from reports in the Winnipeg Free Press newspaper. It is possible that some errors appeared in the original publication.

Post-election changes

Portage la Prairie (res. Fawcett Taylor, 1933), November 27, 1933:
Toby Sexsmith (C) 1166, 1261
E.A. Gilroy (Ind [LP]) 851, 1024
H.A. Ireland (Ind-Lab) 597

Arthur (dec. Duncan McLeod, May 10, 1935), June 24, 1935:
John R. Pitt (LP) accl.

Russell (Isaac Griffiths to cabinet, May 28, 1935), July 4, 1935:
Isaac Griffiths (LP) accl.

Carillon (dec. Albert Prefontaine, 1935), July 4, 1935:
Edmond Prefontaine (LP) 1948
Louis-P. Gagnon 1793

Gimli (res. Einar Jonasson, 1935)

Winnipeg (res. Ralph Maybank, October 1, 1935)

Winnipeg (res. John Thomas Haig, 1935)

Further reading

References

1932 elections in Canada
1932
1932 in Manitoba
June 1932 events